Josh Stein (born May 3, 1973) is an American businessman and venture capitalist. He is a managing partner at Threshold Ventures (formerly DFJ) and was featured in the Forbes Midas List in 2013, 2014 and 2015 in recognition of his accomplishments as an investor. He was also the recipient of the 2015 Deloitte Fast 500 Venture Capitalist of the Year award. Stein holds board responsibilities at Box (company), Chartbeat, LaunchDarkley, LendKey, Lumity, and Talkdesk—and led Box’s first round of institutional investment. He is also an investor in AngelList, Doximity, Front, Loftium,Periscope Data acquired by Sisense, and Rippling,.

Education and early career 
Stein earned an M.B.A from the Stanford University Graduate School of Business and his B.A. from Dartmouth College. Prior to joining DFJ, Stein was a co-founder, director and chief strategy officer for ViaFone, a DFJ-backed startup that created of wireless enterprise applications. Stein previously held positions in product management at Microsoft and NetObjects, and was a management consultant in the San Francisco office of The Boston Consulting Group. Stein is a graduate of the Kauffman Fellows Program.

Draper Fisher Jurvetson 
Stein joined Draper Fisher Jurvetson (DFJ) in 2004.  His previous investments include Redfin, Twilio, SugarCRM, Swell (acquired by Apple), Eventful (acquired by CBS Local), GoodGuide (acquired by UL), iList (acquired by IGN/News Corp), Polaris Wireless (strategic recapitalization), Yammer (acquired by Microsoft), and Yardbarker (acquired by Fox Sports Interactive).

Personal 
He currently serves on the board of trustees of the Crystal Springs Uplands School and the Stanford GSB Trust.

References

External links
Josh Stein - Forbes Midas List 2015
Josh Stein - CNBC  - Jan. 23, 2015
Josh Stein – San Jose Mercury News – Jan. 14, 2014
Josh Stein – TechCrunch – Dec. 13, 2013
Josh Stein on Medium
Josh Stein on Twitter

1973 births
Living people
American venture capitalists
Stanford Graduate School of Business alumni
Dartmouth College alumni